In geometry, given a triangle ABC, there exist unique points A´, B´, and C´ on the sides BC, CA, AB respectively, such that:

 A´, B´, and C´ partition the perimeter of the triangle into three equal-length pieces. That is,
.

 The three lines AA´, BB´, and CC´ meet in a point, the trisected perimeter point.

This is point X369 in Clark Kimberling's Encyclopedia of Triangle Centers.  Uniqueness and a formula for the trilinear coordinates of X369 were shown by Peter Yff late in the twentieth century. The formula involves the unique real root of a cubic equation.

See also
Bisected perimeter point

References

Triangle centers